The Ninth Amendment of the Constitution Act 1984 (previously bill no. 11 of 1984) is an amendment to the Constitution of Ireland that allowed for the extension of the right to vote in elections to Dáil Éireann (the house of representatives of the Oireachtas) to non-Irish citizens. It was approved by referendum on 14 June 1984, the same day as the European Parliament election, and signed into law on 2 August of the same year.

Background
Article 16 of the Constitution of Ireland as approved in 1937, and amended in 1972 to lower the voting age, provided that the franchise for elections to Dáil Éireann would be citizens who have reached the age of 18. The Electoral Amendment Bill 1983, proposed by the Fine Gael–Labour Party government led by Taoiseach Garret FitzGerald, would have amended the Electoral Act 1963 to allow British citizens as defined by the British Nationality Act 1981 to vote in elections to Dáil Éireann. This was to reciprocate the Ireland Act 1949, a British statute, which among other provisions had granted Irish citizens resident in the United Kingdom the right to vote in elections to the British parliament.

The Bill was referred by President Patrick Hillery to the Supreme Court under Article 26 of the Constitution. In a judgment delivered on 8 February 1984, they found the bill to be unconstitutional.

In response, the government then proposed a constitutional amendment which would specifically allow the franchise in elections to Dáil Éireann to be extended to non-Irish citizens. This did not affect presidential elections or referendums, where the text of the Constitution continued to specify citizens only.

Changes to the text
Deletion of the entirety of Article 16.1.2º:

Substitution of new Article 16.1.2º:

Amendment to Article 16.1.3º by the addition of the text in bold:

Oireachtas debates
The Ninth Amendment of the Constitution Bill 1984 was proposed by Minister for the Environment Liam Kavanagh on 11 April 1984. It had the support of opposition party Fianna Fáil and passed all stages of the Dáil without amendment on that day. It passed all stages of the Seanad on the same day.

Information to voters
Under the provisions of the Referendum Act 1984, the changes was described on the polling card sent to voters as:

Result

Note: For this referendum, the constituencies used were each county and county borough (city), which were deemed under section 2 of the Referendum (Amendment) Act 1984 to be constituencies for the purpose of the poll. Usually in Irish referendums the Dáil Éireann general election constituencies are used.

Aftermath
The Electoral (Amendment) Act 1985 was passed the following year. This amended the Electoral Act 1963 to grant the vote to British citizens. It also allowed the Minister for the Environment to extend the franchise to citizens of a member of the European Communities on a reciprocal basis. To date, no such order has been made for any other country.

See also
Irish nationality law
Citizenship
Politics of the Republic of Ireland
History of the Republic of Ireland
Constitutional amendment

References

External links
Ninth Amendment of the Constitution Act 1984
Electoral (Amendment) Act 1985
Full text of the Constitution of Ireland
Oireachtas Debates on the Ninth Amendment of the Constitution Bill 1984

1984 in Irish law
1984 in Irish politics
1984 referendums
09
09
Suffrage referendums
June 1984 events in Europe
Amendment, 09
Amendment, 09
Electoral reform referendums